Lost in City Lights is pop rock band The New Cities' debut album.

Track listing

The iTunes version of the album also includes an alternate version of "Low Radiation" as a bonus track. The album was mixed by Dave "Rave" Ogilvie

Singles

References

2009 debut albums
The New Cities albums
Sony Music Canada albums
Albums produced by Greig Nori